Pallavi Padma-Uday, also known by her academic name Pallavi Singh, is an Indian bilingual poet, writer, journalist and business historian based in the UK.< Her writing has appeared in several prestigious literary journals and leading newspapers in India and the United Kingdom. Her debut poetry collection Orisons in the Dark is forthcoming in April 2023. In 2022, she was featured as one of the artists in 'Breaking Ground Ireland', a landmark project of the Cúirt International Festival of Literature and National University of Ireland Galway. In the same year, Punch Magazine featured her as one of the 40 poets from India in its annual poetry issue.

Childhood and education
Pallavi was born in a family of academics and civil servants in Patna in the state of Bihar, India. Her literary name Padma-Uday is a combination of the first names of her jurist father Uday and entrepreneur mother Padma. She studied for her post-graduate degree in economic history from London School of Economics and Political Science. More recently, she took up research work in the field of Economic History at Queen’s University Centre for Economic History in Belfast. She holds two Masters degrees, one in economic history and another in journalism. She trained to be a journalist at the Asian College of Journalism, Chennai, India and studied English Literature and Economics at the undergraduate level.

Professional career
Pallavi has built and led highly performing marketing teams and advised fast growing startups in India and the UK. She led Content Marketing, Communications and Digital Audience Engagement for two News Corp startups in New Delhi, India. In an earlier stint, she worked as a journalist with leading Indian newspapers such as Hindustan Times, The Indian Express and Mint. She has reported and written long form and enterprise stories on political economy, business, politics and policy, culture, caste and inequality in her journalistic career spanning more than a decade. She writes a business history column and reports on British politics for moneycontrol, and is a member of the Economic History Society in the UK.

Literary career
Her writing has been published in literary journals worldwide including The Honest Ulsterman, Abridged, Muse India, Usawa Literary Review, Madras Courier, Punch Magazine and Outlook. Her Hindi poems have appeared in various literary journals such as Jankipul, Garbhnaal, Hans (magazine), and Vagarth.

Her poems were also anthologised in various Irish anthologies including New World New Voices anthology published by Books Beyond NI, a creative writing project supported by Ulster University, and the CAP Anthology Threshold.

Her writing has been supported by mentoring programs from Arts Council Ireland and Centre for Creative Practices in Dublin, Ireland. In 2022, she won a mentoring fellowship with the Doire Press in Ireland to work with celebrated poet Nandi Jola.

Pallavi writes the EconHistorienne newsletter on Substack and blogs at EconHistorienne.

Bibliography
 2023 (forthcoming): Orisons in the Dark

References

External links

Official website

1986 births
Hindi-language poets
Living people
English-language poets from India
Indian women poets
21st-century Indian poets
Indian journalists
Jibanananda Das Award